Robert Harper Babcock (December 19, 1931 – February 12, 2014) was an American historian of North American labor.

Born in Cincinnati, Ohio in 1931, Babcock's father lost his job in 1933 and he and his parents moved to his mother's hometown of Rochester, New York. He graduated from  Irondequoit High School in suburban Irondequoit, New York in 1949 and studied Social Studies at the New York State College for Teachers at Albany. He graduated from Albany with a B.A. in 1953 and an M.A. in 1957. During this period, he was drafted and served two years in the U.S. Army but was not deployed to the ongoing Korean War. Babcock married Rosemary Kirby in June 1955 while still in the Army. From 1957–66, Babcock taught History at Guilderland Central High School in suburban Albany. He completed his dissertation at Duke University. His first book, Gompers in Canada: A Study in American Continentalism before the First World War, was published by the University of Toronto Press in 1974 and was awarded the Albert B. Corey Prize by the American Historical Association and Canadian Historical Associations. In 1975, Babcock was hired by the University of Maine, where he stayed for the remainder of his career.

Works

Books

Selected articles

References

1931 births
2014 deaths
People from Rochester, New York
Historians from New York (state)
University at Albany, SUNY alumni
Duke University alumni
University of Maine faculty
Historians of Canada
Historians of Maine
Labor historians
Wells College faculty